Clavus minutissimus is a species of sea snail, a marine gastropoda mollusk in the family Drilliidae.

Description
The length of the shell attains 7.2 mm0

Distribution
This marine species occurs off the Philippines.

References

Visaya: 5-60

External links
 Worms Link

minutissimus
Gastropods described in 2018